The 1998 Meath Senior Football Championship was the 106th edition of the Meath GAA's premier club Gaelic football tournament for senior graded teams in County Meath, Ireland. The tournament consists of 19 teams, with the winner going on to represent Meath in the Leinster Senior Club Football Championship. The championship starts with a group stage and then progresses to a knock out stage.  
 
Navan O'Mahonys were the defending champions after they defeated Trim in the previous years final, but they exited to eventual champions St. Peter's Dunboyne this year at the quarter-final stage.

Dunshaughlin were promoted after claiming the 1997 Meath Intermediate Football Championship title, their second Intermediate win and hence their second period as a Senior club.

On 11 October 1998, St. Peter's Dunboyne claimed their first Senior Championship title with a 0-9 to 0-5 win over Oldcastle in the final. Enda McManus raised the Keegan Cup for Dunboyne and also claimed the 'Man of the Match' award

At the end of the championship season, St. Michael's applied to the Meath County Board to be regraded to the 1999 Meath Intermediate Football Championship after a series of poor results. This ended their nine-year stay in the senior grade since being promoted in 1989.

Team changes
The following teams have changed division since the 1998 championship season.

To S.F.C.
Promoted from I.F.C.
 Dunshaughlin  -  (Intermediate Champions)

From S.F.C.
Regraded to I.F.C.
 None

Group stage

Group A

Round 1:
 Oldcastle 0-16, 1-13 Carnaross, Ballinlough, 5/4/1998,
 St. Peter's Dunboyne 2-10, 1-9 Slane, Pairc Tailteann, 11/4/1998,
 Kilmainhamwood 0-10, 1-6 St. Michael's, Kells, 12/4/1998,    
 Summerhill  -  Bye,

Round 2:
 Kilmainhamwood 2-10, 0-8 Summerhill, Martry, 18/4/1998,   
 Oldcastle 1-10, 0-9 St. Peter's Dunboyne, Pairc Tailteann, 18/4/1998,
 Carnaross 2-13, 1-11 St. Michael's, Kells, 19/4/1998,
 Slane  -  Bye,

Round 3:
 Kilmainhamwood 2-14, 3-5 Carnaross, Kells, 3/6/1998,
 Summerhill 1-12, 0-6 Slane, Skryne, 5/6/1998,   
 St. Peter's Dunboyne 5-16, 1-3 St. Michael's, Bective, 6/6/1998, 
 Oldcastle  -  Bye,

Round 4:
 Kilmainhamwood 0-14, 1-5 Slane, Kilberry, 4/7/1998,      
 St. Peter's Dunboyne 0-16, 1-12 Carnaross, Pairc Tailteann, 4/7/1998,
 Oldcastle 0-11, 0-7 Summerhill, Athboy, 4/7/1998,
 St. Michael's - Bye,

Round 5:
 Oldcastle 4-10, 0-5 Slane, Martry, 18/7/1998,
 St. Peter's Dunboyne 1-9, 1-7 Kilmainhamwood, Pairc Tailteann, 16/8/1998,
 Summerhill 1-17, 1-12 St. Michael's,
 Carnaross  -  Bye,

Round 6:
 Summerhill 2-15, 2-5 Carnaross, Pairc Tailteann, 22/8/1998,  
 Oldcastle 0-12, 1-7 Kilmainhamwood, Kells, 23/8/1998,         
 St. Michael's w/o, scr Slane,               
 St. Peter's Dunboyne  -  Bye,

Round 7:
 St. Peter's Dunboyne 0-11, 0-9 Summerhill, Dunshaughlin, 30/8/1998,
 Oldcastle w/o, scr St. Michael's, Carnaross, 30/8/1998,
 Carnaross w/o, scr Slane,
 Kilmainhamwood  -  Bye,

Group B

Round 1:
 Skryne 0-17, 1-13 Gaeil Colmcille, Pairc Tailteann, 5/4/1998,
 Simonstown Gaels 1-7, 0-6 Dunshaughlin, Pairc Tailteann, 11/4/1998,
 Ballinlough 0-13, 2-5 Moynalvey, Kildalkey, 11/4/1998,

Round 2:
 Gaeil Colmcille 0-12, 0-9 Dunshaughlin, Kilberry, 18/4/1998,
 Ballinlough 1-13, 1-10 Skryne, Walterstown, 18/4/1998, 
 Moynalvey 1-9, 1-8 Simonstown Gaels, Summerhill, 19/4/1998,

Round 3:
 Dunshaughlin 1-12, 0-9 Ballinlough, Pairc Tailteann, 5/6/1998,
 Skryne 6-19, 1-3 Moynalvey, Dunshaughlin, 5/6/1998,
 Gaeil Colmcille 0-12, 0-8 Simonstown Gaels, Martry, 6/6/1998,

Round 4:
 Dunshaughlin 0-10, 1-5 Moynalvey, Dunboyne, 4/7/1998,
 Simonstown Gaels 3-11, 1-11 Skryne, Pairc Tailteann, 5/7/1998,
 Ballinlough 1-7, 1-6 Gaeil Colmcille, Drumbaragh, 5/7/1998,

Round 5:
 Gaeil Colmcille 0-15, 0-6 Moynalvey, Dunderry, 18/7/1998,
 Simonstown Gaels 0-10, 0-6 Ballinlough, Kells, 18/7/1998,
 Skryne 0-12, 0-10 Dunshaughlin, Pairc Tailteann, 16/8/1998,

Quarter-final Playoff:
 Skryne 4-14, 1-9 Ballinlough, Pairc Tailteann, 21/8/1998,
 Simonstown Gaels 0-16, 0-11 Gaeil Colmcille, Pairc Tailteann, 22/8/1998,

Group B

Round 1:
 Seneschalstown 2-10, 2-7 Trim, Pairc Tailteann, 4/4/1998,
 Dunderry 1-10, 0-7 Navan O'Mahonys, Kells, 4/4/1998,
 Walterstown 0-20, 1-9 Cortown, Pairc Tailteann, 5/4/1998,

Round 2:
 Dunderry 0-12, 1-6 Trim, Kildalkey, 18/4/1998,
 Seneschalstown 1-5, 0-7 Cortown, Pairc Tailteann, 19/4/1998,
 Walterstown 1-6, 0-7 Navan O'Mahonys, Pairc Tailteann, 19/4/1998,

Round 3:
 Dunderry 3-7, 1-10 Seneschalstown, Pairc Tailteann, 6/6/1998,
 Walterstown 1-9, 0-7 Trim, Pairc Tailteann, 6/6/1998,
 Navan O'Mahonys 2-15, 0-9 Cortown, Dunderry, 7/6/1998,

Round 4:
 Cortown 1-19, 2-10 Trim, Kildalkey, 4/7/1998,
 Navan O'Mahonys 0-12, 0-10 Seneschalstown, Pairc Tailteann, 5/7/1998,
 Dunderry 0-10, 0-6 Walterstown, Pairc Tailteann, 5/7/1998,

Round 5:
 Seneschalstown 1-15, 1-4 Walterstown, Pairc Tailteann, 15/8/1998,
 Navan O'Mahonys 0-10, 0-8 Trim, Kilmessan, 16/8/1998,
 Cortown 3-9, 2-8 Dunderry, Trim, 16/8/1998,

Quarter-final Playoff Semi-final:
 Seneschalstown 1-12, 1-9 Walterstown, Pairc Tailteann, 28/8/1998,

Quarter-final Playoff Final:
 Navan O'Mahonys 0-5, 1-2 Seneschalstown, Pairc Tailteann, 6/9/1998,

Quarter-final Playoff Final Replay:
 Navan O'Mahonys 2-8, 0-9 Seneschalstown, Pairc Tailteann, 13/9/1998,

Knock-out Stage

Finals

Quarter-final:
 Simonstown Gaels 1-8, 1-7 Dunderry, Pairc Tailteann, 30/8/1998,
 St. Peter's Dunboyne 0-13, 0-6 Navan O'Mahonys, Pairc Tailteann, 20/9/1998,

Semi-final:
 Oldcastle 0-11, 1-7 Simonstown Gaels, Pairc Tailteann, 20/9/1998,
 St. Peter's Dunboyne 1-10, 0-10 Skryne, Pairc Tailteann, 27/9/1998,

Final:
 St. Peter's Dunboyne 0-9, 0-5 Oldcastle, Pairc Tailteann, 11/10/1998,

Leinster Senior Club Football Championship

Preliminary round:
 Kilmacud Crokes 2-7, 1-9 St. Peter's Dunboyne, Pairc Tailteann, 8/10/1998,

References

External links

Meath Senior Football Championship
Meath Senior Football Championship